"Money on My Mind" is a 2014 song by Sam Smith.

Money on My Mind may also refer to:

"Money on My Mind", a 2006 song by Daz Dillinger from the album So So Gangsta
"Money on My Mind", a 2005 song by Lil Wayne from the album Tha Carter II
"MoneyOnMyMind", a 2020 song by Upsahl
"Mind on My Money (Money on My Mind)", a 2013 song by Cashis